The 2001–02 Wyoming Cowboys basketball team represented the University of Wyoming during the 2011–2012 NCAA Division I men's basketball season. The team was led by fourth-year head coach Steve McClain and played their home games at the Arena-Auditorium in Laramie, Wyoming. The Cowboys were a member of the Mountain West Conference. Wyoming finished the season 22–9, 11–3 in Mountain West play to finish in first place. They lost to San Diego State in the semifinals of the Mountain West Basketball tournament. The Cowboys received an at-large bid to the NCAA tournament as No. 11 seed in the West region. In the opening round, they defeated No. 6 seed Gonzaga before falling to No. 3 seed Arizona in the second round. This was Wyoming's first trip to the round of 32 since 1987 and, as of the 2021–22 season, its most recent NCAA Tournament victory.

Roster

Schedule and results

|-
!colspan=9 style=| Non-conference regular season

|-
!colspan=9 style=| Mountain West Regular Season

|-
!colspan=9 style=| Mountain West tournament

|-
!colspan=9 style=| NCAA tournament

References

Wyoming Cowboys basketball seasons
Wyoming
Wyoming
Wyoming Cowboys bask
Wyoming Cowboys bask